Palolem Beach is situated in Canacona in southern Goa, India. The beach attracts many international tourists, mainly during the winter season between November and March. It is considered to be one of the region's most beautiful beaches.

Overview
Palolem Beach is largely unspoiled and is inhabited by both local fishermen and by foreign tourists who live in shacks along the shore or in the main village itself. It is about one mile (approximately 1.61 km) long and is crescent-shaped; one can view the entire beach from either end. Both ends of the beach consist of rocks jutting out into the sea. The depth of the sea increases gradually, being shallowest at the northern end of the beach, making it safe for average swimmers, and the currents are not fast.

Location

Other neighbouring beaches in South Goa include Agonda Beach and Patnem Beach.

Travel
The nearest airport is Dabolim Airport, around 67 km away. The nearest railway station is at Canacona, which can be reached from the major Madgoan junction railway station in just 30 mins. There are bus services every half an hour between Palolem beach and the Kadamba Transport Corporation (KTC) Bus Depot in Margao. The nearest KTC depot is at Canacona.

Ranking
Palolem beach was ranked the 20th best beach in Asia by TripAdvisor in 2018
It was ranked India's fifth best beach by TripAdvisor in 2018

Activities
Things to do on Palolem beach include yoga classes, dolphin-spotting trips, Ayurvedic massages and silent discos.

See also
List of beaches in Goa

References

External links

 
  'Before Sunrise Before Sunset, Travelogue in Lounge, 30-05-2009, by Arjun Razdan
  'Palolem.net Guide  
 Palolem Village

Beaches of South Goa district
Beaches of Goa